Benjamin F. Emanuel (born on June 18, 1982 in Texas City, Texas) is a former American football free safety. He went to UCLA.  He attended Clear Brook High School.

Professional career
Emanuel was drafted  the Carolina Panthers in the 5th round (171st overall) in the 2005 NFL Draft and spent time on the practice roster before being traded to the San Francisco 49ers and dressed for 11 games, starting eight, recording 45 tackles, one sack, one interception, and three pass knockdowns.  He signed with the Cleveland Browns in 2006 but did not play.

On March 11, 2008, Emanuel signed as a free agent with the Calgary Stampeders. He did not play.

Fitness Trainer 
As a trainer, Ben specializes in weight management and human performance. He trains top business executives, consults celebrity trainers, creates corporate wellness initiatives, works with USTA affiliates in promoting the advancement of Adaptive Tennis for amputees, and spent two years in the Middle East training high profile clients. 

Ben is a Corrective Exercise Specialist (PES) and holds a Personal Training Certification (CPT) accredited by the highly coveted National Academy of Sports Medicine (NASM). He approaches fitness with an athlete’s mentality; giving full effort and no excuses. This method has proven efficient in helping his clients reach their personal fitness and performance goals.

Notes 

1982 births
Living people
People from Texas City, Texas
American football safeties
UCLA Bruins football players
Cleveland Browns players
San Francisco 49ers players
Calgary Stampeders players
Players of American football from Texas